Dystopia was an American crust punk band that formed in Orange County, California in 1991. They were popular in both the heavy metal and punk scenes, due in large part to the band's bleak, misanthropic imagery. Dystopia's lyrics often dealt with human emotions and social or political issues such as environmentalism, racial equality, substance abuse, and animal rights.  Their music utilized the slow, heavy sound of sludge metal whilst including more up-beat elements drawing from crust punk, grindcore, and noise rock.

Members

Todd Kiessling – bass (Confrontation, Mange, Agrimony, Kontraklasse, Sour Vein, Screaming Fetus, Sex Powers)
Matt "Mauz" Parrillo – guitar, vocals, samples (Cantankerous, Mindrot, Medication Time, Nigel Pepper Cock, Drain the Sky, John the Baker and the Malnourished, Kicker)
Anthony "Dino" Sommese – drums, vocals (Carcinogen, Ghoul, Asunder, Lachrymose, Insidious, Noothgrush)

Previous members
Dan Kaufman – vocals (1991–1993) (Mindrot, Eyes of Fire, Destroy Judas)
Phil Martinez – drums (1991) (Phobia, Apocalypse)

Discography

 Studio Album
Human = Garbage 12-inch (1994, Life Is Abuse/Misanthropic Records) 
The Aftermath 12-inch (1999, Life Is Abuse/Misanthropic Records) 
Dystopia CD/LP (2008 Life Is Abuse)

 EPs
Backstabber 7-inch (1997, Life Is Abuse/Misanthropic Records/Common Cause

 Live Albums
Live in the Studio demo tape (1992, self-released)

 Splits
Dystopia/Grief 7-inch (1993 Life Is Abuse/Misanthropic Records)
Dystopia/Embittered 12-inch (1993 Life Is Abuse/Misanthropic Records)
Dystopia/Suffering Luna 7-inch (1995 Life Is Abuse/Misanthropic Records)
Dystopia/Skaven 12-inch (1996 Life Is Abuse/Misanthropic Records)
Twin Threat to Your Sanity[Bongzilla/Noothgrush/Corrupted/Dystopia] 2-7"(2001 Bad People Records)

 Compilation appearances
"Anger Brought by Disease" on Cry Now Cry Later Vol. 2 2×7″ (1995 Pessimiser Records)
"Backstabber" (live) on Fiesta Comes Alive LP/CD (1997 Slap-A-Ham Records)
"Backstabber" on Reality Part Two LP/CD (1997 Deep Six Records)
"Cosmetic Plague (Rudimentary Peni)" on Whispers 2xLP/CD (1997 Skuld Records)
"Anger Brought by Disease" on Cry Now Cry Later Vol. 1 & 2 CD (1998 Pessimiser Records)
"Diary of a Battered Child" on Twin Threat to Your Sanity 2×7″ (2001 Bad People Records/Riotous Assembly Records)

References

External links
Life Is Abuse Records

American crust and d-beat groups
Political music groups
American sludge metal musical groups
Musical groups established in 1991
Heavy metal musical groups from California
American doom metal musical groups
Musical groups disestablished in 2005
Musical groups from Orange County, California
1991 establishments in California
American experimental musical groups
Hardcore punk groups from California